Patricia Miller may refer to:

Pat Miller (dog trainer) (born 1951), American dog trainer
Patricia Miller (Indiana politician) (born 1936), American politician
Patricia Billie Miller, Connecticut politician
Patricia Miller (tennis) (born 1972), Uruguayan tennis player
Patricia H. Miller, developmental psychologist
Patricia Cox Miller, professor of religion